Actifsource is a domain specific modeling workbench. It is realized as plug-in for the software development environment Eclipse. Actifsource supports the creation of multiple domain models which can be linked together. It comes with a UML-like graphical editor to create domain specific languages and a general graphical editor to edit structures in the created languages. It supports code generation using user-defined generic code templates which are directly linked to the domain models. Code generation is integrated into Eclipse's incremental build process.

Interoperability 
Actifsource can use models from other modelling tools by importing and exporting the ecore format which is defined by the Eclipse Modeling Framework.

Licensing policy 
There are two versions of actifsource available: The free community edition which can be used freely for non-commercial projects and the enterprise edition which contains additional features. The enterprise edition comes with customer support and maintenance for a limited period of time. This package allows the customers to upgrade to new versions and maintenance releases during their support period.

See also 
 Model-driven engineering
 Domain-specific modeling
 CIP-Tool

References

External links 
 Product web site

Programming tools
Eclipse software